Chale is a village in Mulshi taluka of Pune District in the Indian state of Maharashtra. It is surrounded by the Four Talukas of Karjat, Talegaon Dabhade, Mawal and Khalapur. The Districts closest to the village are Raigad district, Thane district, Mumbai City district and the Mumbai Suburban district.  The nearest railway stations to the village are  Vadgaon, Begdewadi, Lonavala, Talegaon and Kamshet.

References

External links
  Villages in Mulshi taluka 
  Villages in Pune,  Maharashtra
 List of villages in Mulshi Tehsil

Villages in Mulshi taluka